Squadron Leader Peter Christy (1937 – 6 December 1971), SJ, was a PAF bomber pilot and weapon systems officer (WSO). A B-57 Canberra navigator, Squadron Leader Christy was officially declared "missing in action" since December 1971, but widely presumed dead by the Pakistan Armed Forces .

Education
Christy was born in Karachi then-British India in 1937. The son of Maula Bakhsh Christy, a fire fighter in the Air Force who belonged to Multan. He initially completed his secondary school education at St Patrick's High School, Karachi and matriculated with good marks. According to Christy's teachers, he had been a very intelligent student who always performed very well in sports as well. He was known to have a keen sense of humor.

Air Force career
Christy entered the Pakistan Air Force Academy in 1955 and graduated from a basic flying training program in 1958. The same year he was sent to the Commanders and Combat Flight School at Shorkot. He graduated from there with a specialisation in air weapons system and gained a commission in the Pakistan Air Force. Christy began his career in 1962 as a flying officer. In 1964, Christy was promoted to flight lieutenant.

Christy served as a B-57 Canberra navigator pilot and flew a number of successful operational missions in the 1965 war. His bravery and eagerness to serve gained him praise and he was conferred with Tamgha-i-Jurat by the Government of Pakistan in 1965 at a public ceremony. In 1968, he was promoted to the rank of squadron leader in the Pakistan Air Force.

Christy subsequently ceased active service and began working for Pakistan International Airlines (PIA). He was abroad working with PIA when the Indo-Pakistani War of 1971 broke out. Christy volunteered for war service with the PAF in December 1971. Christy was selected for bomber operations.

On 4 December 1971 at 4:00 o'clock in the evening from PAF Base Faisal, he was given a special mission to destroy an Indian Air Force special air station located at Jamnagar.

After attending continuous briefing sessions with his commanders, he, as a weapon systems officer (WSO) and navigator, along with Wing Commander Stephen Israel prepared for the mission. The mission codename was "Do-or-Die (DoD)". On 6 December 1971, Christy was detailed as navigator for a bombing mission to Jamnagar. The mission was completed successfully and the Indian Air Force's air station was completed destroyed. The plane was shot down during their return and Peter Christy was captured by the Indians. Christy failed to return to base.

Disappearance and aftermath
It was widely speculated that his aircraft was shot down by an Indian surface-to-air missile and that he had been captured. However, after the war, India denied shooting down such an aircraft on 6 December and was unable to track down the pilot. On 8 December, he was officially declared as "missing in action". The Government of Pakistan posthumously awarded him the third highest military award, the Sitara-e-Jurat (Star of Courage), in 1971. On 6 September 2006, independent analyst B. Harry published the war study report IAF Combat Kills- 1971 Indo-Pak Air War, claiming that Christy had died while returning to Pakistan when the IAF's anti-aircraft artillery shot down Christy's plane, and that he had died before capture. However, India's Ministry of External Affairs declined to comment. On 6 September 2004, Squadron Leader Peter Christy was honoured by the Pakistan Television (PTV) in a program sponsored by the Inter Services Public Relations (ISPR).

See also
 List of people who disappeared
 8-Pass Charlie
 Group Captain Saiful Azam
 Sarfaraz Ahmed Rafiqui
 Mervyn Middlecoat
 Muhammad Mahmood Alam
 Marium Mukhtiar
 Ayesha Farooq

References

External links
 Chronological Listing of Pakistani
 The Forgotten Few!

1937 births
1970s missing person cases
1971 deaths
Aerial disappearances of military personnel in action
Military personnel from Karachi
Military personnel missing in action
Missing person cases in India
Pakistan Air Force officers
Pakistan Air Force personnel
Pakistani aviators
Pakistani Christians
Pakistani military personnel of the Indo-Pakistani War of 1971
Pilots of the Indo-Pakistani War of 1965
Recipients of Sitara-e-Jurat
Shot-down aviators
St. Patrick's High School, Karachi alumni